Dzhamaldin Abdukhalitovich Khodzhaniyazov (born 18 July 1996) is a Turkmen-Russian professional football player who plays for Akron Tolyatti.

Biography
Khodzhaniyazov was born in the Turkmenistan city of Baýramaly. He is fluent in Russian.

Club career
A graduate of the Tashkent sports school Chilanzar. First coach – Gregory Rozyev. He played for the tolyattin Akademiya Tolyatti.

In the winter of 2012 he moved to Zenit Saint Petersburg, signing a contract for 3 years. On  26 July 2013 he made his first team debut in a league match against Kuban Krasnodar.

He joined the Danish club AGF on 31 August 2015, with Zenit retaining buy-back rights. His contract got terminated in July 2017.

On 2 December 2017, he returned to Russia, signing a contract with FC Dynamo St. Petersburg.

On 16 June 2018, he moved to FC Baltika Kaliningrad. On 27 July 2018, after just two league games for Baltika, he signed with the Russian Premier League club FC Ural Yekaterinburg. After playing just two games for Ural (one in the league and another in the Russian Cup), his contract was dissolved by mutual consent on 29 January 2019.

On 11 March 2019, Khodzhaniyazov signed with Belarusian club FC BATE Borisov. A few months later, in August 2019, he moved to Azerbaijani club Sumgayit.

International career
He began performing for the Russian youth team in 2012. With it he attended the Viktor Bannikov Memorial Tournament where he played four matches. In the tournament the team finished in second place, losing the final in a penalty shootout to Ukraine.

In the junior team of Russia he went to the European U-17 Championship 2013. In the first match, he scored his first goal for Russia. At this tournament, he played all five games, and Russia U-17 team became European champion. He also participated in the 2013 FIFA U-17 World Cup.

Later he represented Russia national under-19 football team at the 2015 UEFA European Under-19 Championship, where Russia came in second place. He is available to represent for either senior Russia or Turkmenistan.

Career statistics

Club

Honours

Club
Zenit Saint Petersburg
Russian Football Premier League: 2014–15

International
 2013 UEFA European Under-17 Football Championship winner with Russia.

References

External links
 
 
 

1996 births
Living people
People from Mary Region
Turkmenistan emigrants to Russia
Russian people of Uyghur descent
Uyghur sportspeople
Turkmenistan people of Uyghur descent
Russian people of Turkmenistan descent
Russian footballers
Turkmenistan footballers
Association football defenders
Russia youth international footballers
Russia under-21 international footballers
Naturalised citizens of Russia
Russian Premier League players
Russian First League players
Russian Second League players
Azerbaijan Premier League players
Danish Superliga players
Belarusian Premier League players
Russian expatriate footballers
Expatriate men's footballers in Denmark
Expatriate footballers in Belarus
Expatriate footballers in Azerbaijan
Russian expatriate sportspeople in Denmark
Russian expatriate sportspeople in Belarus
Russian expatriate sportspeople in Azerbaijan
FC Zenit Saint Petersburg players
FC Zenit-2 Saint Petersburg players
FC Amkar Perm players
Aarhus Gymnastikforening players
FC Dynamo Saint Petersburg players
FC Baltika Kaliningrad players
FC Ural Yekaterinburg players
FC BATE Borisov players
Sumgayit FK players
FC Akron Tolyatti players